Hanchang may refer to:

Chinese places
 Yueyang, Hunan Province, China - anciently called Hanchang
 Hanchang Town (汉昌镇), a town in Pingjiang County, Hunan province.

Korean place
 Hanchang, Korea